Pension Schöller is a 1960 West German comedy film directed by Georg Jacoby and starring Theo Lingen, Christa Williams and Rudolf Vogel. It is an adaptation of the 1890 play Pension Schöller by Wilhelm Jacoby and Carl Laufs. Georg Jacoby was Wilhem's son, and made three film adaptation of his father's best known play in 1930, 1952 and 1960.

It was shot at the Wandsbek Studios in Hamburg. The film's sets were designed by the art directors Albrecht Becker and Herbert Kirchhoff.

Cast
Theo Lingen as Professor Schöller
Christa Williams as Fritzi
Rudolf Vogel as Gutsbesitzer Klapproth
Boy Gobert as Eugen Rümpel
Ann Smyrner as Erika
Helmut Lohner as Peter Klapproth
Ilse Steppat as Amalie Schöller
Leon Askin as Fritz Bernhardi
Ursula Herking as Josefine Krüger
Rainer Bertram as Tommy Kiesling
Christa Siems as Ulrike Klapproth
Benno Gellenbeck as Artist Zarini
Joachim Wolff
Henry Vahl

References

External links

1960 comedy films
German comedy films
West German films
1960s German-language films
Films directed by Georg Jacoby
German films based on plays
Remakes of German films
Real Film films
Films shot at Wandsbek Studios
1960s German films